Brian Fallon (born 1933)  is one of Ireland's foremost art critics. He was born in 1933 at Cootehill, County Cavan, the second son of the poet Padraic Fallon, and was educated at St Peter’s College, Wexford, and Trinity College, Dublin. He was Chief Critic of The Irish Times for 35 years and its Literary Editor for 11 years (1977 to 1988). He has written numerous books on Irish art and frequently lectures on the subject of art.

Work
Irish Art 1830-1990, Brian Fallon (author), Appletree Press.
An Age of Innocence: Irish Culture 1930-1960, Brian Fallon (author),Gill & Macmillan (1998). 
"Patrick Swift and Irish Art"(1993), Brian Fallon, published in Patrick Swift: An Irish Painter in Portugal, Gandon Editions, 2001.
Imogen Stuart, Sculptor, Brian Fallon (author). 
Tony O'Malley, by Enrique Juncosa (Author), Caoimhin Mac Giolla Leith (Author), Catherine Marshall (Author), Brian Fallon (Author), Irish Museum of Modern Art (17 Nov 2005).
Charles Tyrrell (Dublin: Gandon 1994), Brian Fallon (author).
Martin Gale (Dublin: Gandon 1995), Brian Fallon (author). 
Sean McSweeney (Dublin: Gandon 1996),Brian Fallon (author).
Edward McGuire (Dublin: Irish Academic Press 1991), Brian Fallon (author).
The Vision of MacConglinne and Other Plays, by Padraic Fallon (Author), Brian Fallon (Editor).
Raconteur: A Collection of Short Stories By Masters of the Art (Summer 1994) (Paperback) by  John Cheever (Author), John Deane (Author), Brian Fallon (Author), David Hubbins (Author), Petter Kettle (Author), Alison Leathart (Author), Jules Lemaitre (Author), Marjorie Smith (Author), Keith Waterhouse (Author).

Further reading
The Irish Times, biography 
Irish Arts Review. Article by Fallon,  CIAS at IMMA,
The Irish Times, Brian Fallon on Marc Chagall 
The Independent, Connor Fallon Obituary 

1933 births
Living people
Alumni of Trinity College Dublin
Irish art critics
Irish literary critics
The Irish Times people